World Class Cuisine is an American television program created by Jason Vogel and Arna Vodenos and co-produced by the Discovery Channel between 1993 and 1997, featuring the talents of professional chefs from around the globe.   John Kavanaugh was a camera man for the show's duration and directed part of one season.  Tomi Bednar Landis co-produced one season alongside the Discovery Channel. somewhat unusual in its rather spartan production style, its content is marked by its stark simplicity. The show presents world class chefs in their own environments, in professional kitchens as opposed to production studios. Many of the chefs on the program do not speak English, and their instructions are usually translated, while others choose not to speak at all, leaving the narration in the hands of the presenter. The program commonly adopted a format of a three-course meal consisting of an appetizer, a main course, and a dessert, with three different chefs presenting their own signature dishes. Lisa Simeone took over as the narrator.

See also
Great Chefs

External links
American Food Recipes

Discovery Channel original programming
1993 American television series debuts
1997 American television series endings
1990s American cooking television series